The 1974–75 Scottish Division One was won by Rangers by seven points over second place Hibernian.

League restructure

Following the 1974-75 season, the Scottish football league system was restructured from a two division setup to three divisions. The top 10 teams from this season stayed in the top flight, known as the Scottish Premier Division. The remaining eight clubs were joined by the top 6 from Division Two to form the Scottish First Division.

Table

Results

See also
Nine in a row

References

External links
League Tables

1974–75 Scottish Football League
Scottish Division One seasons
Scot